Helen Margaret Morton (born 30 September 1949) is an Australian politician. She was a Liberal member of the Western Australian Legislative Council from 2005 to 2017, representing the region of East Metropolitan.

On 14 December 2010, Morton was appointed Minister for Mental Health and Disability Services. Before that she was a parliamentary secretary for various ministries. Morton graduated in 1969 with an Associate Diploma in Occupational Therapy from the Western Australian Institute of Technology (now Curtin University).

After the 2013 state election, Morton added the portfolio of child protection to her existing portfolios.

Morton was also the Deputy Leader of the Upper House in the Legislative Council.

References

External links
 WA Parliament bio
 Parliament @ Work Bio

1949 births
Living people
Liberal Party of Australia members of the Parliament of Western Australia
Members of the Western Australian Legislative Council
21st-century Australian politicians
21st-century Australian women politicians
Women members of the Western Australian Legislative Council